In the infamous 2003 Kiliroor sex scandal, a teenaged girl named Sari S. Nair, hailing from Kiliroor, Kottayam, Kerala, India was sexually abused by reportedly being promised roles in TV serials. She was taken to many places in and around Kerala and was allegedly exploited sexually by "influential persons".

Shari S Nair later died after she gave birth to a daughter who is now being raised by her parents.

According to official sources, the request to the Centre was based on a suggestion by Kerala Police DGP P K Hormis Tharakan that the probe be handed over to CBI in view of the political nature of the case and the reported involvement of prominent persons.

Six persons, including the key accused Latha Nair who allegedly took the girl to many places, had already been arrested in the case, now being probed by a special police team.

Kerala government has recommended to the Centre to order a CBI inquiry into the scandal. The CBI filed chargesheet against nine persons in the sensational case before the Chief Judicial Magistrate, Ernakulam.

5 accused are plead guiltily for rape of Shari Nair

References 

Crime in Kerala
Rape in India
History of Kottayam district
2003 crimes in India
People from Kottayam district
History of Kerala (1947–present)
Incidents of violence against girls